The Secret Life of Hernando Cortez is a 1968 experimental film by John Chamberlain. It starred two of Andy Warhol's Factory actors, Ultra Violet and Taylor Mead.

History 
John Chamberlain is primarily known as a sculptor, but starting in 1968 he made two experimental films. The plot of this film is casual, like many counterculture films of the 1960s, and was essentially about "what to do after arriving in Veracruz". The film has been described in writings as "freeform," "sexually explicit," and as "hallucinatory soft porn". Chamberlain described an underlying theme of "conquest". Art critic and curator Edward G. Leffingwell helped write the screenplay, and fashion designer Tiger Morse served as the costume designer. It was filmed in color in the Yucatán and has a 58 minutes runtime.

The Secret Life of Hernando Cortez was screened in February 1967 at Hunter College, alongside Chamberlain's film Wide Point (1968), also starring Taylor Mead. Both films were shown at the 1968 Annual Exhibition, at Whitney Museum of American Art. It was later shown in the context of movie theaters, film festivals and international art exhibitions. The Secret Life of Hernando Cortez has a cult following. The film is part of the Chinati Foundation collection. A flyer for the 1967 film screening at Hunter College is part of the collection at the Smithsonian Institution.

Cast 
 John Chamberlain, as Blackie Norton
 Taylor Mead, as Hernando Cortez
 Ultra Violet (also known as Isabelle Collin Dufresne), as 'Daughter of Montezuma'

See also 
 Hernán Cortés

References

External links 
 
 The Secret Life of Hernando Cortez (film excerpt 20 mins) from YouTube

1968 films
American avant-garde and experimental films
Films shot in Mexico
1968 in American cinema